Püssi is a town in Lüganuse Parish, Ida-Viru County, in northeastern Estonia, with a population of 917 . It is located near the road between Tallinn and St. Petersburg.

History
Following the end of the Soviet Union's 45-year rule over Estonia, Püssi saw a sharp economic downturn and a population exodus. In 1989, the population of Püssi stood at 2,400 people, and 20 years later, in 2009, was only 1,809. The population has continued to decrease and by 2012 stood at 1,783 people. In October 2013, Püssi along with Maidla Parish were merged into Lüganuse Parish, and therefore ceased to exist as sovereign municipalities.

Economy
By 2002 Püssi had accumulated 20 million kroons of debt, the equivalent to 1.3 million euros; and property values had become so low that apartments were valued around zero. Since then, the city's economy has begun to recover. Püssi has planned the construction of an industrial park. The Chairman of the town council, in an interview with The Baltic Times, marketed Püssi by stating that property values in the city were only 1% of those of the capital city of Tallinn.

Püssi has historically served as a production center for particle board. At the time of the collapse of the Soviet Union, the town's largest employer was particle board manufacturer Repo Vabrikud, which employed 1,400 people, over half the city. Although Repo Vabrikud has scaled back employment significantly, other particle board manufacturers have moved in. Sorbes Group has the production center for its "Repo by Sorbes" line of particle board in Püssi. In 2011, the Estonian furniture manufacturer Viisnurk took over an inactive softboard factory in the city with the intention to manufacture softboard for international clients in Asia and Europe.

In December 2010, Siemens announced that Püssi had been selected as the location of one of two converter stations for their "EstLink 2" high voltage power line between Estonia and Finland.

Culture
Püssi is the home of the Püssi Punk Festival, which has run annually since 2005, and features rock, metal, blues, and indie musicians from several countries.

The town contains an artificial mountain made of ash from an oil shale power plant that has been depositing ash in the location since the 1930s. The mountain is used for motocross racing.

Notable people
Herbert Brede (1888–1942), army general. Born in Püssi.
Piret Hartman (born 1981), politician. Born in Püssi. 
Carl Timoleon von Neff (1804–1877), painter. Born in Püssi.

Gallery

References

External links

Cities and towns in Estonia
Lüganuse Parish
Former municipalities of Estonia
Kreis Wierland